The Passenger Port of St. Petersburg is a passenger port in Saint Petersburg, Russia. It was completed on 27 May 2011 and was officially handed over to the city government. It is located on reclaimed alluvial territories of the Marine Facade of Vasilevsky island fronting the Gulf of Finland on the Baltic Sea.

History
The necessity of building a new passenger terminal was caused by the inability of the existing Marine Terminal for cruise ships longer than 200 meters. As a consequence, large passenger ships arrived in the commercial port of St. Petersburg. In 2002, the St. Petersburg administration has proposed to build a modern complex for the reception of cruise ships. The corresponding government order to begin construction of the marine passenger terminal was signed in 2005, Russian Prime Minister Mikhail Fradkov. In 2006 Marine facade Company has built:
 35 hectares of reclaimed land;
 The technological channel on water area of seaport for building of moorings;
 Access technological road;
 The dividing dam.
By July 2007, 28th the educational sailing vessel named "Young Baltiets" was moored at berth number seven. In 2008 two moorings, building the cruise terminal and coastal constructions necessary for work are constructed and transferred in the summer. On September, 10th, 2008 the port accepted the first passenger cruise liner a 16-deck Italian vessel named "Costa Mediterranea". In 2009, On August a hydrofoil line to Peterhof and Winter Palace was started. In 2011 work on the passenger port was completed and the newly completed Marine Facade sea passenger port was officially handed over to the city government.

References 

Gulf of Finland
Ports and harbours of Russia